Ivan Kusnjer (born 10 November 1951) is a Czech baritone opera singer. His discography includes recordings of many of the main baritone roles of Czech opera and song.

Early life, education and family
Kusnjer was born in Rokycany in 1951. He graduated from the Music Faculty of the Academy of Performing Arts in Prague, studying with Teodor Šrubař. He performed as an opera singer on stages in Ostrava and Brno. In 1982 he started to work at the National Theatre in Prague. He also attended voice master classes at Accademia Sigiana in Siena and Accademia Santa Cecilia in Rome.

He has performed on opera and concert stages around the world, including La Scala in Milan, Carnegie Hall in New York City, Opéra-Comique and Théâtre du Châtelet in Paris, Opéra national de Lorraine in Nancy, Vienna's Staatsoper, La Monnaie in Brussels, and the Berlin State Opera. He has won acclaim at festivals in Cagliari, Hong Kong, Tel Aviv, Frankfurt and Göteborg.

Ivan Kusnjer is a founder of the Fatum foundation, which supports families of musicians who died.

Awards
He has three Thalia Awards, for the roles of Tonio in Leoncavallo's Pagliacci (1994), King George in Peter Maxwell Davies's Eight Songs for a Mad King (1997) and Vok Vítkovic in Smetana's The Devil’s Wall (2001). He also received the Gustav Mahler Award in 2000.

Selected recordings
 Czech Opera Rarities (Supraphon 1984; reissued 2011) Arias include:
 Josef Mysliveček's Abramo e Isaco
 Josef Leopold Zvonař's Záboj
 Skuherský's Lora
 Karel Šebor's The Templars in Moravia
 Smetana's The Brandenburgers in Bohemia
 Dvořák's Vanda
 Josef Rozkošný's St John's Rapids
 Karel Bendl's Lejla
 Eduard Nápravník's Dubrovskij
 Josef Foerster's Jessika
 Otakar Ostrčil's The Death of Vlasta
 Zdeněk Fibich's Hedy
 Jiří Pauer's Zuzana Vojířová
 Vítězslav Novák's Karlštejn
 Dvořák The Spectre's Bride 2002; Macal, New Jersey Symphony, Delos CD  DE 3296.

References

1951 births
Living people
People from Rokycany
Czech opera singers
Czech baritones
Operatic baritones
Recipients of the Thalia Award